José Luis Cabrera Padilla (born 14 January 1956) is a Mexican politician affiliated with the Party of the Democratic Revolution. As of 2003-2006 he served as Deputy of the LIX Legislature of the Mexican Congress representing the Federal District. After that, he served as Jefe Delegacional (Mayor) of borough of Milpa Alta in Mexico City from 2006 to 2009.

References

1956 births
Living people
Politicians from Mexico City
Party of the Democratic Revolution politicians
National Autonomous University of Mexico alumni
21st-century Mexican politicians
Deputies of the LIX Legislature of Mexico
Members of the Chamber of Deputies (Mexico) for Mexico City